Harefoot may refer to:
Harold Harefoot, King of England from 1035 to 1040
Harefoot mushroom, Coprinopsis lagopus